According to Rudolf Carnap, in logic, an interpretation is a descriptive interpretation (also called a factual interpretation) if at least one of the undefined symbols of its formal system becomes, in the interpretation, a descriptive sign (i.e., the name of single objects, or observable properties). In his Introduction to Semantics (Harvard Uni. Press, 1942) he makes a distinction between formal interpretations which are logical interpretations (also called mathematical interpretation or logico-mathematical interpretation) and descriptive interpretations: a formal interpretation is a descriptive interpretation if it is not a logical interpretation.

Attempts to axiomatize the empirical sciences, Carnap said, use a descriptive interpretation to model reality.:  the aim of these attempts is to construct a formal system for which reality is the only interpretation. - the world is an interpretation (or model) of these sciences, only insofar as these sciences are true.

Any non-empty set may be chosen as the domain of a descriptive interpretation, and all n-ary relations among the elements of the domain are candidates for assignment to any predicate of degree n.

Examples

A sentence is either true or false under an interpretation which assigns values to the logical variables. We might for example make the following assignments:

Individual constants
 a: Socrates
 b: Plato
 c: Aristotle
Predicates:
 Fα:  α is sleeping
 Gαβ:  α hates β
 Hαβγ: α made β hit γ

Sentential variables:
 p  "It is raining."

Under this interpretation the sentences discussed above would represent the following English statements:
 p: "It is raining."
 F(a): "Socrates is sleeping."
 H(b,a,c):  "Plato made Socrates hit Aristotle."
 x(F(x)): "Everybody is sleeping."
 z(G(a,z)):  "Socrates hates somebody."
 xyz(H(x,y,z)):  "Somebody made everybody hit somebody."
 xz(F(x)G(a,z)): Everybody is sleeping and Socrates hates somebody.
 xyz (G(a,z)H(x,y,z)): Either Socrates hates somebody or somebody made everybody hit somebody.

Sources 

Semantics
Formal languages
Interpretation (philosophy)